Andrew John McLean (born 1976) is a male retired boxer who competed for England.

Boxing career
McLean was a double English National Champion in 1998 and 2000 after winning the prestigious ABA lightweight title, boxing out of the Birtley ABC.

He represented England in the lightweight (-60 kg) division and won a bronze medal, at the 1998 Commonwealth Games in Kuala Lumpur, Malaysia.

He turned professional on 17 March 2001.

References

1976 births
English male boxers
Boxers at the 1998 Commonwealth Games
Living people
Commonwealth Games medallists in boxing
Commonwealth Games bronze medallists for England
Lightweight boxers
Medallists at the 1998 Commonwealth Games